Slickers vs. Killers (Chinese: 黐線枕邊人) is a 1991 Hong Kong action comedy film produced, directed by and starring Sammo Hung.

Plot
Although a hapless telephone salesman, Success Hung finds himself engaged in a selling war with a new saleswoman, Miss Cheng, that soon proves to be the least of his problems. After witnessing a feud between two hitmen and a local gang of triads, Hung finds himself the target of the more neurotic and violent of the two hitmen, Bat. Having survived various attempts on his life by the hitmen, Bat and Owl, Hung also discovers that his wife Lisa's policeman colleague Ai has more than a professional interest in her. Taking a leaf out of Bat and Owl's book, the jealous policeman also decides that Hung would be better off dead. In one madcap night, all of these problems are solved with poor old Hung naturally in the middle of it all.

Cast
Sammo Hung as Success Hung
Carol Cheng as Miss Cheng
Lam Ching-ying as Owl
Jacky Cheung as Bat
Joyce Godenzi as Doctor Ko
Yu Li as Lisa Yu
Collin Chou as Ai
Richard Ng as Mr. Chow
Tommy Wong as murder victim
Teddy Yip as Boss Yip
Billy Ching as gang member
Billy Lau as man at mall
Clifton Ko as Robert
Lo Kin as gang leader
Yam Wai-hung as gang member
Pauline Wong as female cop
Wu Zhan-peng as victim
Huang Kai-sen as Wong Sam
Hon Ping as gang member
Tsim Siu-ling as gang member
Timmy Hung as gang member
Chu Wan-ling as gang member
Yuen Miu as cop
Leung Kei-hei as waiter
Lam Kwok-kit as gang member

Box office
The film grossed HK$5,724,819 at the Hong Kong box office during its theatrical run from 13 to 25 September 1991 in Hong Kong.

See also
Sammo Hung filmography
Jacky Cheung filmography

External links

Slickers Vs. Killers at Hong Kong Cinemagic

1991 films
1991 action thriller films
1991 martial arts films
1991 action comedy films
1990s crime comedy films
1990s martial arts comedy films
1990s comedy thriller films
Hong Kong action thriller films
Hong Kong action comedy films
Hong Kong martial arts comedy films
Kung fu films
Hong Kong serial killer films
1990s Cantonese-language films
Films directed by Sammo Hung
Films set in Hong Kong
Films shot in Hong Kong
1990s Hong Kong films